Janghwa Hongryeon jeon is a Korean folktale.

Janghwa Hongryeon jeon may also refer to:
 Janghwa Hongryeon jeon (1924 film)
 Janghwa Hongryeon jeon (1936 film)
 Janghwa Hongryeon jeon (1956 film)
 Janghwa Hongryeon jeon (1972 film)
 The Story of Jang-hwa and Hong-ryeon (1962 film)